Macedonian Canadians are Canadian citizens of ethnic Macedonian descent, who reside in Canada. According to the 2021 Census there were 39,435 Canadians who claimed full or partial Macedonian ancestry.

History

Ethnicity and origins 
In the first half of the 20th century, most of the Macedonians were largely classified as Bulgarians or Macedono-Bulgarians. Until World War II, most people who today identify themselves as Macedonian Canadians claimed a Bulgarian ethnic identity and were recorded as part of the Bulgarian ethnic group. The term Macedonian was used as a geographic/regional term rather than an ethnic one. At that time the political organization by the Slavic immigrants from the region of Macedonia, the Macedonian Patriotic Organization, also promoted the idea of Macedonian Slavs being Bulgarians.

History of immigration 
Many Macedonians emigrated to Canada as "pečalbari" (seasonal workers) in the early 20th century. Thousands of Macedonians emigrated to Canada after the failure of the Ilinden Uprising.

The first Macedonian organizations were the Zhelevo Benevolence Brotherhood and the Oschima Benefit Society St. Nicholas, both established in 1907 in Toronto by emigrants from Zhelevo (Antartiko) and Oschnima (Trigonon) in Aegean Macedonia. Other Macedonian organizations were soon established by emigrants from Zagorichani (Vassiliada), Oshtima (Trigonon), Smardesh (Krystallopigi), Gabresh (Gavros), Banitsa (Vevi), Buf (Akritas) and Tarsie (Trivuno), all villages in Aegean Macedonia.

An internal 1910 census counted 1090 Macedonians in Toronto, who were principally from Florina (Lerin) and Kastoria (Kostur) then in Ottoman empire. During the same year, they established the Sts. Cyril and Methody Macedono-Bulgarian Orthodox Church in Toronto. and that church published The First Bulgarian-English Pocket Dictionary in 1913.

By 1940 there were claims that over 1200 Macedonian families were in Canada. Post-World War II and Greek Civil War migration cause the numbers of Macedonians in Canada to swell.

Many early Macedonian immigrants found industrial work in Toronto, either as factory hands or labourers in abattoirs, or in iron and steel foundries. Many ended up running and owning restaurants, butchers and groceries. Macedonian entrepreneurs and their descendants eventually employed their numerical strength within the food service industry as a catapult into a variety of larger and more sophisticated ventures.

Today,  most Macedonian Canadians have moved out of cities and into the suburbs, and are employed in the professional, clerical, and service sector of the economy.

The 2001 census recorded 31,265 Macedonians, while the 2006 census recorded 37,705 people of Macedonian ancestry. However, community spokespersons claim they number over 100,000. The Institute for Macedonians Abroad claims that there are 120,000 Macedonians in Canada. The Macedonian government estimates that there are 150,000 Macedonians in Canada.

Aegean Macedonians

Many thousands of Aegean Macedonians emigrated to Canada in the 1890s. They settled primarily in Ontario, especially Toronto. Many early Aegean Macedonian immigrants found industrial work in Toronto. Later migrants found work as factory in abattoirs and foundries. Chatham and Windsor attracted many Macedonian immigrants who worked along the railroads. Many later settled in Detroit, Michigan.

Many Aegean Macedonians are parishioners of the Macedonian Orthodox Church.

They set up many organizations, such as the Lerin Region Macedonian Cultural Association of Canada. In 1979 The Association of Refugee Children from Aegean Macedonia (ARCAM) was set up in order to unite the former child refugees from all over the world. It was reported that chapters had been set up in Toronto, Melbourne, Perth, the Republic of North Macedonia, Slovakia, Czech Republic and Poland.

Settlement patterns

Many Macedonians originally settled in industrial areas. Most Macedonians came to Canada via the process of chain migration.

Organizations

Many organizations have been set up by the Macedonians in Canada. Village associations from Banitsa, Osčima, Bouf and Želevo have been set up. A Macedonian Boys' club was founded in Toronto in 1915. Community picnics were also very common amongst Macedonian immigrants. Macedonian basketball and hockey teams were founded. Fundraisers for assistance for the Greek Civil War and the 1963 Skopje earthquake were held. Other establishments, such as the Canadian Macedonian Restaurant Co-op (1970), Canadian Macedonian Business and Professional Association, Canadian Macedonian Historical Society and Macedonian Canadian Medical Society (1992) have been founded in recent years, along with the Macedonian Film Festival (2006). Youth organizations such as Macedonian Association of Canadian Youth, Ryerson Association of Macedonian Students and the Association of Macedonian Students at the University of Toronto are also in operation.

Religion

Originally Macedonian churches were established under the Bulgarian Diocese of America, Canada and Australia. The church Saint's Cyril and Methodius was consecrated in Toronto in 1910. This was followed by the St. George Macedono-Bulgarian Orthodox Church and the Holy Trinity Macedono-Bulgarian Church. Post-war immigrants built churches under the jurisdiction of the Macedonian Orthodox Church. They were St Clement of Ohrid, St Demetrius of Salonica, St Ilija, St Nedela and St Naum of Ohrid. There are two Macedonian cathedrals in Canada – Toronto being the location of the largest Macedonian church community in Canada: St Clement of Ohrid in Toronto.

Notable Macedonian Canadians

Academia
 Chris Paliare  –  lawyer, named one of the 50 most influential in Toronto
Andrew Rossos –  historian
Boris P. Stoicheff – physicist

Art
Gligor Stefanov – Sculptor and Iconographer
Georgi Danevski -- Painter, Iconographer and Muralist

Arts 
John Evans - actor, producer, Toronto, Ontario
 Virginia Evans – Artistic Director of the Macedonian Film Festival, Toronto, Ontario

Business
John Bitove – Chairman and CEO of Obelysk,  Mobilicity, Scott's Real Estate Investment Trust, and SiriusXM Canada
John Bitove, Sr. – businessman and philanthropist
 Jordan Bitove - Publisher, Toronto Star and Owner of Torstar
Lou Naumovski – Vice President, Commercial and General Director, Russia, for Kinross Gold Corporation
Susan Niczowski – CEO and founder of Summer Fresh Salads Inc.
Chris Pavlovski - CEO and founder of Rumble
Steve Stavro – businessman and philanthropist; founder of Knob Hill Farms, owner of Toronto Maple Leafs, director of Liquor Control Board of Ontario
 Nada Laskovski – entrepreneur, co-founder of UrbanToronto and Chart Attack
 Lorne Bozinoff  - founder and CEO of Forum Research

Music
Dan Talevski – singer-songwriter
 Kaitlyn Milanis  – Soundcloud Rapper and Litigator

Politics
Paul Christie – Toronto City and Metropolitan Councillor, TTC Chair
Lui Temelkovski – Liberal MP, Oak Ridges, Markham 2004–2008

Sports
Tommy Ivan – NHL coach, winner of four Stanley Cups
Dan Jancevski – NHL defenseman
Ed Jovanovski – NHL player
Steve Staios – NHL player
Steven Stamkos – NHL player
Alek Stojanov – NHL player
Christopher Tanev – NHL player
Brandon Tanev – NHL player
Michael Zigomanis – NHL player
José Théodore – NHL player
Mike Angelidis -- NHL player

Television and entertainment
Nicole Servinis – reporter on Breakfast Television (Toronto) and producer for Entertainment Tonight Canada
Ziya Tong – television producer
 Stephanie Skenderis  – television producer and reporter for CBC News
Natasha Negovanlis – actress, singer, writer
Thea Andrews -- journalist and TV personality
 Lex Gigeroff -- television writer, actor and co-creator of the science fiction series Lexx.

Other
 Angel Shopoff  - Civil engineer in charge of the construction of the Burlington Skyway

See also

 Macedonian Patriotic Organization

References

External links
Macedonian Community of Toronto Blog
Macedonia Canadian Newspaper
Headquarters of the Macedonian Community in Canada
United Macedonians of Canada
Macedonian Human Rights Movement
Canadian Macedonian Historical Society
United Macedonian Diaspora
Macedonian Embassy in Canada
St Clement of Ohrid, Toronto
Macedonian Centre for Culture and Social Integration

+
European Canadian
Macedonian diaspora